Robert Michael Bender (born April 28, 1957) is an American professional basketball coach, who last served an assistant coach with the Memphis Grizzlies of the National Basketball Association. Born in Quantico, Virginia, He attended Bloomington High School in Bloomington, Illinois, where he was an All-American in basketball. Bender has the distinction of being the only individual to play on two teams in two NCAA Championship games. He was a freshman on Bob Knight's undefeated 1976 Indiana team and played point guard at Duke from 1977 to 1980, including an appearance in the title game against Kentucky. Bender was drafted by the San Diego Clippers in the sixth round before his senior year, but did not play.

He began his coaching career as an assistant at Duke under Mike Krzyzewski. He later served as head coach at Illinois State University and the University of Washington, and was an assistant with the Philadelphia 76ers.

Bender is married to his wife, Alice, with whom he has two children: Mary Elizabeth and Robert Michael Bender III.

On June 17, 2013, Bender was hired as an assistant coach of the Milwaukee Bucks, under Larry Drew, of whom he was an assistant to at the Atlanta Hawks.

Head coaching record

Notes

References

1957 births
Living people
American men's basketball players
Atlanta Hawks assistant coaches
Basketball coaches from Virginia
Basketball players from Virginia
Bloomington High School (Bloomington, Illinois) alumni
College men's basketball head coaches in the United States
Duke Blue Devils men's basketball players
Illinois State Redbirds men's basketball coaches
Indiana Hoosiers men's basketball players
Memphis Grizzlies assistant coaches
Milwaukee Bucks assistant coaches
Parade High School All-Americans (boys' basketball)
People from Quantico, Virginia
Philadelphia 76ers assistant coaches
San Diego Clippers draft picks
Sportspeople from the Washington metropolitan area
Washington Huskies men's basketball coaches
Point guards